Scrobipalpa montanella is a moth in the family Gelechiidae. It was described by Pierre Chrétien in 1910. It is found in southern France and Sicily.

The larvae feed on Anthemis cretica. They mine the leaves, but also live freely, feeding on the stem and leaves. The larvae are pale green, with reddish transverse bands and a pale brown head.

References

Scrobipalpa
Moths described in 1910